Alfred Shemweta (born February 19, 1970 in Lushoto, Tanzania) is a male long-distance runner who competed internationally for Sweden. He twice won the Stockholm Marathon during his career: 1999 and 2000. Shemweta set his personal best time of 2:14:52 in the men's marathon on June 12, 1999, as part of his winning run at the Stockholm Marathon.

He was selected to represent Sweden at the 1999 World Championships in Athletics and he finished 28th in the men's marathon race. Shemweta retained his title at the Stockholm Marathon the following year.

Achievements

References

1970 births
Living people
Tanzanian male marathon runners
Swedish male long-distance runners
Swedish people of Tanzanian descent